Kawęczyn Sędziszowski  is a village in the administrative district of Gmina Sędziszów Małopolski, within Ropczyce-Sędziszów County, Subcarpathian Voivodeship, in south-eastern Poland.

Formerly an independent village, it became incorporate to the town of Sędziszów Małopolski effective 1 January 2019.

References

Villages in Ropczyce-Sędziszów County